Abbasi (also Romanized as ‘Abbāsī; also known as Bāzanganeh) is a village in Hayat Davud Rural District, in the Central District of Ganaveh County, Bushehr Province, Iran. At the 2006 census, its population was 687, in 151 families.

References 

Populated places in Ganaveh County